Laurelwood Park is a  public park in Portland, Oregon's Foster-Powell neighborhood, in the United States. The park was acquired in 1923. The wedge-shaped park underwent a major renovation in 2021.

References

External links

 

1923 establishments in Oregon
Foster-Powell, Portland, Oregon
Parks in Portland, Oregon